Mikkola is a Finnish surname. Notable people with the surname include:

 Esko Mikkola (born 1975), Finnish javelin thrower
 Hannu Mikkola (1942–2021), retired world champion rally driver
 Heikki Mikkola (born 1945), four time World Champion motocross racer
 Niko Mikkola (born 1996), Finnish ice hockey player
 Seppo Mikkola (born 1947), Finnish astronomer
 Tom Mikkola (born 1979), Finnish musician

See also
Luolajan-Mikkola

Finnish-language surnames